Berca Airfield is a former civil airport and military airfield, located in the  Al Birkah suburb of Benghazi, Libya.

The facility appears to be a pre-World War II civil airport which may have also been used by the Italian Regia Aeronautica Air Force.  After the Italian invasion of Egypt and the arrival of the German Luftwaffe in 1941, it was used by the Axis as a military airfield.

After the seizure of Bengazi by the British Eighth Army during the Western Desert Campaign in early 1943, it was used by the United States Army Air Force during the North African Campaign by the 98th Bombardment Group, which flew B-24 Liberator heavy bombers from the airfield between 26 March-4 April 1943.

In the 1950s and 1960s Berka II was Detachment 3 (a radar site ) of the 633rd Aircraft Control and Warning Squadron, which had its main site at Wheelus Air Force Base at Tripoli and Detachment 2 at Misurata, both in Libya. Not sure when these were activated/ deactivated, but I was personally stationed in Benghazi from October 1956 until the beginning of December 1957.  At the time, I seem to recall spelling Berka was with a ‘k’, not a ‘c’.

Its subsequent postwar history is unknown, today the area has been rebuilt into part of the urban area of Benghazi.

From about 1960 to 1967 or thereabouts the airstrip was used as a base by World Wide Helicopters Ltd who were flying both small fixed wing aircraft and helicopters in support of oil exploration activity in the desert.

References

 Maurer, Maurer. Air Force Combat Units of World War II. Maxwell AFB, Alabama: Office of Air Force History, 1983. .

External links

Airfields of the United States Army Air Forces in Libya
World War II airfields in Libya